is a Japanese photographer. His work explores human intervention with the landscape and natural materials, including the life of cities and the built environment.

Life

Hatakeyama was born in Japan Rikuzentakata, Iwate, in 1958.  He graduated from the University of Tsukuba, School of Art and Design in 1981 and completed postgraduate studies at the University of Tsukuba in 1984.

Awards

1997: 22nd Kimura Ihei Memorial Photography Award
2000: 16th Higashikawa Domestic Photographer Prize
2001: 42nd Mainichi Award of Art
2003: Photographer of the Year Award from the Photographic Society of Japan

Books

Lime Works.  Tōkyō: Synergy, 1996. .
Lime Works. Osaka: Amus Arts Press, 2002. .
Lime Works. Kyōto: Seigensha, 2008. .
Underground. Tōkyō: Media Factory, 2000. .
Under Construction. Tōkyō: Kenchiku Shiryo Kenkyusha, 2001. .
Slow Glass. United Kingdom: Light Xchange and The Winchester Gallery, 2002. .
畠山直哉 = Naoya Hatakeyama. Kyōto: Tankōsha, 2002. .
Naoya Hatakeyama.  Ostfildern-Ruit, Germany: Hatje Cantz, 2002. .
Atmos. Portland, Ore.: Nazraeli Press, 2004. .
Zeche Westfalen I/II Ahlen. Portland, Ore.: Nazraeli Press, 2006. .
Two Mountains - Naoya Hatakeyama and Balthasar Burkhard. Tokyo: Executive Committee of Two Mountains, 2006. .
Scales. Portland, Ore.: Nazraeli Press, 2007. .
Terrils. La Madeleine, France: Light Motiv Editions, 2011. .
Ciel Tombé. Kamakura, Japan: Super Labo, 2011. .
 Kesengawa, Light Motiv, France 
 Naoya Hatakeyama: Excavating the Future City Aperture, USA 2018

Exhibitions

2001: Fast and Slow, Japanese Pavilion, 49th Venice Biennale. Curator: Eriko Osaka. 
2003: Atmos, Les Rencontres d'Arles, France. Curator: François Hébel.
2009: Rencontres d'Arles, Arles, France.
2011–2012: Naoya Hatakeyama: Natural Stories, Tokyo Metropolitan Museum of Photography and San Francisco Museum of Modern Art.
2019-2020: Maquettes/Light, Tate Modern

References

External links 
 Naoya Hatakeyama at L.A.Galerie Lothar Albrecht

1958 births
Living people
People from Iwate Prefecture
Japanese photographers
University of Tsukuba alumni
Japanese contemporary artists
Recipients of the Medal with Purple Ribbon